District Head Quarters (DHQ) Hospital is the second largest and oldest hospital in the city of Faisalabad. It is located on Mall Road near the Faisalabad Railway Station and Faisalabad Central Bus Stand. 

DHQ Hospital serves as the secondary teaching hospital of Punjab Medical College.

Location 
DHQ Hospital Faisalabad is located on Mall Road across the street from Faisalabad Development Authority and in close proximity to the Faisalabad Railway Station.

Services 
DHQ Hospital Faisalabad contains a number of qualified doctors and teaching staff. It provides all facilities to its patients, has treatment available for many diseases, and a burn center. There is also an emergency ward open 24 hours.

Surgical Unit
Gynaecology Unit
Psychiatry Unit
Chest Disease Unit
Dermatology Unit
Ear, Nose and Throat (ENT) Unit
Pediatric Unit
Radiology Unit
Emergency Room (24 Hours)
Outpatient Department

See also 
 List of hospitals in Pakistan

References

External links 
 See Allied Hospital on Google Maps

Hospitals in Punjab, Pakistan
Faisalabad
Teaching hospitals in Pakistan